Pauline Parmentier was the defending champion, but lost in the second round to Elena Rybakina.

Petra Martić won her first WTA Tour title, defeating Markéta Vondroušová in the final, 1–6, 6–4, 6–1.

Seeds

Draw

Finals

Top half

Bottom half

Qualifying

Seeds

Qualifiers

Lucky losers

Draw

First qualifier

Second qualifier

Third qualifier

Fourth qualifier

Fifth qualifier

Sixth qualifier

References

External links
 Main Draw
 Qualifying Draw

İstanbul Cup
2019 in Turkish tennis
Istanbul Cup - Singles
2019 in Istanbul
İstanbul Cup